Akqi Town (also as Aheqi Town) is a town and the county seat of Akqi County in Xinjiang Uygur Autonomous Region, China. Located in the middle of the county, it covers an area of 1,454 kilometres with a population of 8,251 (as of 2018), of them are from Kyrgyz, Han and Uyghur peoples. The town has 2 communities, 3 administrative villages and 8 unincorporated villages under jurisdiction, its seat is at Nandajie Street.

History
It was formerly Uq, part of the 1st district in 1950 and the 2nd district in 1954. The Uq Commune was established in 1962, and renamed to Hongqi Commune, Uq Commune in 1978. It was organized as a town named it after Akqi County in 1984.

Communities and villages
The town was divided into 2 communities and 3 villages in 2008. The community of Youyilu was established in 2013, the two communities of Nandajie and Yanhelu were amalgamated in 2017. There are 5 communities and 3 villages under its jurisdiction.

 Jiankanglu Community 
 Hepinglu Community 
 Youyilu Community 
 Nandajie Community 
 Yanhelu Community 
 Uq Village 
 Piqan Village 
 Jolangqi Village

References 

Township-level divisions of Akqi County
County seats in Xinjiang